Oberamt (plural ) was the designation of an administrative unit in the German state of Württemberg, introduced in 1758 instead of Amt. Literally translated, the term means Upper, Senior, Higher or Superior Office.

History

Duchy 

The subdivision of the Duchy of Württemberg (until 1495 county) into public administration called  reflected in its diversity the gradual growth of the territory. In addition to the secular offices, which made up the largest part of the state, there were monastic, rentier and chamber offices. Some larger offices, such as the Amt Urach, were divided into several  (“sub-offices”). For clarification, the offices themselves were called Oberamt from 1758 on, without structural reforms being connected with this renaming. The ducal civil servant, who was traditionally called Vogt (about equal to “bailiff”) and who managed the administrative affairs at the official level, held the title  from 1759. From that day on, “all and every secondary title with the bailiff′s word was to cease immediately and only the Oberamtmann′s name was to be valid.” He was responsible for the implementation of government measures in his bailiwick, for example by publishing new laws, receiving complaints from subjects and forwarding them to the appropriate higher authorities. He also warned persons who only slightly violated laws. For example, it was decided here how the road construction in the district was to be financed. The official assembly also elected its representatives for the so-called "Landschaft".

Kingdom 

After the areas that had been assigned to the House of Württemberg as a result of the upheavals of the Napoleonic era since 1803 were initially administered separately as "Neuwürttemberg", the organisational edict of 1806 - Württemberg had in the meantime risen to become the Kingdom of Württemberg - initiated the creation of uniform structures. In the following years the declaration of intent
"An expedient division and merger of the senior and staff offices will be made gradually. 
and the whole country, regardless of historical and denominational circumstances, will be newly divided into approximately equal senior offices, the number of which was reduced to 64 by 1810 and to 63 by 1819 with the abolition of the Albeck senior office. A special role was played by the Residence City Stuttgart, where the  fulfilled the corresponding tasks.

The higher offices were subordinate to the Ministry of the Interior and were responsible for all essential areas of state administration, only the financial system was in the hands of the Kameralämter since 1806. Since 1814 every senior office received a public health officer under the title  (senior physician). According to the understanding of the state at that time, administration and jurisdiction were not separate, rather the senior civil servant presided over the High Court in personal union. Municipal self-governance and the right to a say of the estates, which had already been temporarily restricted under Duke Carl Eugen, was suspended by King Friedrich.

King Wilhelm I. took over the government in 1816 and immediately began comprehensive reforms, which led to the constitution of 1819 and thus changed Württemberg from an absolute to a constitutional Monarchy. The edicts issued on 31 December 1818 regulated various aspects of the restored local self-government:
 The sheriff's offices became Selbstverwaltungskörper.
 This resulted in a double function of the senior civil servant, who was not only a civil servant as before, but also functioned as organ of the official authority.
 Administration and justice were separated from each other at the  level.

Chapter V of the Constitution contained detailed information on the administrative structure and rights of municipalities and official bodies. In particular, § 64 provided that  limits could only be changed by law, i.e. with the consent of parliament. This possibility was only used very sparingly; only in 1842 were major changes made, affecting around thirty municipalities. A bill introduced by the government in 1911 to simplify administration in the sense of cost savings provided for only 42 , but was rejected by the Chamber of Deputies.

People's state 

The protests caused by this led to the resignation of the government, the emergency decree was withdrawn and subsequently only the Weinsberg  was abolished (on 1 April 1926).

Nazi dictatorship 

In 1933, the organs of local self-government were dissolved. After the Oberamtmann had already been titled Landrat since 1928, following the Prussian style, the Kreisordnung of 1934 replaced the names Oberamt by Kreis and Amtskörperschaft by Kreisverband, but did not yet include a change of boundaries. Only with the administrative district reform of 1938 were 27 of the remaining 61 districts abolished.

Descriptions of the local authorities 

The mainly catholic “new Württemberg” areas, e.g. in Oberschwaben, as described from the point of view of the Württemberg bureaucracy in evangelically influenced Stuttgart, often bear certain characteristics. Quote from the description of Oberamt Ravensburg, p. 29: “The character of the inhabitants is generally praised more than in other neighbouring districts, it is described as simple and trusting”.

The Oberamt descriptions have become sought-after and expensively paid collector's items; therefore all volumes were reprinted in the 1970s. Most of these reprints meanwhile are out of print again. All of them are now available in digital form, see Wikisource.

Today's traces of the  boundaries 
In the former Württemberg region of contemporary Baden-Württemberg, often the  courts are located in the former Oberamt cities.

The ecclesiastical administrative structures of the Evangelical-Lutheran Church in Württemberg also largely reflect the former higher offices. In most of the former cities of the Oberamt cities there is still the seat of a deanery, whose area of responsibility is the same as the former Oberamt. Deviations from this mainly occur in the predominantly Catholic areas and wherever new deaneries were established due to an increase in church members, such as in Ditzingen or Bernhausen.

List of the Württemberg  (1811 to 1934)

References

Literature 
 Walter Grube: Vogteien, Ämter, Landkreise in Baden-Württemberg. Stuttgart 1975, 
 Historischer Atlas von Baden-Württemberg, Karten VII,4 und VII,5 mit Beiwort. Stuttgart 1976

Weblinks 

Württemberg